Legal Aid for Women (JURK) is a Norwegian non-profit NGO offering legal advice to women on a voluntary and free basis, and a think tank focusing on matters relating to women and the law. It is affiliated with the University of Oslo Faculty of Law. It was founded in 1974. It is a member of the Norwegian Women's Lobby and the Forum for Women and Development.

References

External links
Official website

Women's rights organizations
Women's organisations based in Norway
Human rights organisations based in Norway
Feminism in Norway
Organizations established in 1974